Mount Pulitzer is a prominent mountain, 2,155 m, standing 7 nautical miles (13 km) northeast of Mount Griffith on the elevated platform between Koerwitz and Vaughan Glaciers, in the Queen Maud Mountains. Discovered in December 1934 by the Byrd Antarctic Expedition geological party under Quin Blackburn, and named by Byrd for Joseph Pulitzer, publisher of the St. Louis Post-Dispatch, a patron of the Byrd Antarctic Expedition of 1928-30 and 1933–35.

Mountains of the Ross Dependency
Amundsen Coast